Maypearl High School is a public high school located in Maypearl, Texas (USA) and classified as a 3A school by the UIL.  It is part of the Maypearl Independent School District located in west central Ellis County.  In 2015, the school was rated "Met Standard" by the Texas Education Agency.

Athletics
The Maypearl Panthers compete in these sports - 

Cross Country, Volleyball, Football, Basketball, Golf, Tennis, Track, Softball, and Baseball.

State Finalists

Trombone player - 
1995(2A)

References

External links
 

Public high schools in Texas
Schools in Ellis County, Texas